Sir Robert William Perks, 1st Baronet (24 April 1849 – 30 November 1934) was a British Liberal politician.

He was the son of George Thomas Perks (1819 – 1877), a Wesleyan Methodist preacher. He was educated at Kingswood School and at King's College London (1867–71). He then qualified as a solicitor, and became a partner of Henry Fowler, 1st Viscount Wolverhampton.

He was elected to Parliament at the 1892 general election as the Liberal Member of Parliament for Louth. Perks was a prominent member of the Liberal Imperialists and its successor the Liberal League, in both organisations acting as treasurer. He was made a baronet in 1908, and retired from Parliament at the 1910 general election.

In 1898, Perks proposed the creation of the Wesleyan Methodist Twentieth Century Fund (also known as the 'One Million Guinea Fund') which aimed to raise one million guineas (£1.1s. or £1.05) to build a church in Central London. The fund had raised £1,073,682 by the time it closed in 1909, part of which was used to purchase the former Royal Aquarium site for the construction of the Methodist Central Hall, Westminster.

In 1932 at the age of 83 Perks was elected vice-president of the Methodist Conference as the man most responsible for Methodist Union.

He died in 1934 aged 85 and is buried in Brookwood Cemetery. His son succeeded him in the baronetcy. His daughter, Edith Mary, married Sir Bertram Allen in 1908.

References

External links 
 

1849 births
1934 deaths
People educated at Kingswood School, Bath
Alumni of King's College London
Baronets in the Baronetage of the United Kingdom
UK MPs 1892–1895
UK MPs 1895–1900
UK MPs 1900–1906
UK MPs 1906–1910
Liberal Party (UK) MPs for English constituencies
Burials at Brookwood Cemetery
People associated with transport in London
English tax resisters